Boston Music Hall, 12/5/72 is an album by the country rock band the New Riders of the Purple Sage.  It was recorded live on December 5, 1972, at the Music Hall in Boston, Massachusetts, and released on November 11, 2003.  It was the second complete New Riders concert that was recorded in the 1970s and released in the 2000s as an album on the Kufala Recordings label.

Eric Andersen was the opening act at the Boston show.  He sat in with the New Riders for their encore — his own song "I Love to Sing My Ballad, Mama" and the Rolling Stones' "Honky Tonk Women".

The album cover photo of the band was taken on or about the date of the concert, and depicts, from left to right, Spencer Dryden, Dave Torbert, John "Marmaduke" Dawson, David Nelson, and Buddy Cage.

Recording and sound quality
According to a statement on the back cover, the CD "was mastered directly from the original half track analog reel to reel tapes, recorded at 7.5 ips.  What you hear on the 30+ year-old tapes is the way it went down."

Track listing

Disc one
"Truck Drivin' Man" (Terry Fell) – 3:23
"Whatcha Gonna Do" (John Dawson) – 3:24
"Hello Mary Lou" (Gene Pitney, Cayet Mangiaracina) – 3:18
"Rainbow" (Dawson) – 3:07
"Down In The Boondocks" (Joe South) – 3:26
"Portland Woman" (Dawson) – 6:38
"She's No Angel" (Wanda Ballman, J.W. Arnold) – 3:07
"School Days" (Chuck Berry) – 4:19
"Henry" (Dawson) – 4:21
"Long Black Veil" (Danny Dill, Marijohn Wilkin) – 4:20
"Sailin'" (Dawson) – 3:05
"Contract" (Dave Torbert) – 3:26
"Glendale Train" (Dawson) – 5:05
"Louisiana Lady" (Dawson) – 3:54

Disc two
"I Don't Know You" (Dawson) – 4:38
"Sutter's Mill" (Dawson) – 3:18
"Groupie" (Torbert) – 3:43
"Whiskey" (Dawson) – 3:14
"Last Lonely Eagle" (Dawson) – 5:48
"Willie and the Hand Jive" (Johnny Otis) – 13:27
"I Love to Sing My Ballad, Mama (But They Only Wanna Hear Me Rock 'n' Roll)" (Eric Andersen) – 3:09
"Honky Tonk Women" (Mick Jagger, Keith Richards) – 5:21

Personnel

New Riders of the Purple Sage
John Dawson – rhythm guitar, vocals
David Nelson – lead guitar, vocals
Dave Torbert – bass guitar, vocals
Buddy Cage – pedal steel guitar
Spencer Dryden – drums, percussion

Additional musicians
Eric Andersen – guitar, vocals on "I Love to Sing My Ballad, Mama" and "Honkey Tonk Women"

Production
Rob Bleetstein – producer
Bill Culhane – recording
Stephen Barncard – mastering

Notes

New Riders of the Purple Sage live albums
2003 live albums